Davis may refer to:

Places

Antarctica 
 Mount Davis (Antarctica)
 Davis Island (Palmer Archipelago)
 Davis Station, an Australian base and research outpost in the Vestfold Hills 
 Davis Valley, Queen Elizabeth Land

Canada  
 Davis, Saskatchewan, an unincorporated community
 Davis Strait, between Nunavut and Greenland
 Mount Davis (British Columbia)

United States 
 Davis, California, the largest city with the name
 Davis, Illinois, a village
 Davis, Massachusetts, an abandoned mining village
 Davis, Maryland, a ghost town
 Davis, Missouri, an unincorporated community
 Davis, North Carolina, an unincorporated community and census-designated place
 Davis, Oklahoma, a city
 Davis, South Dakota, a town
 Davis, West Virginia, a town
 Davis, Logan County, West Virginia, an unincorporated community
 Davis Island (Connecticut)
 Davis Island (Mississippi)
 Davis Island (Pennsylvania)
 Davis Peak (Washington)
 Fort Davis, Oklahoma
 Mount Davis (California)
 Mount Davis (New Hampshire)
 Mount Davis (Pennsylvania)

Other 
 Than Kyun or Davis Island, Burma
 Mount Davis, Hong Kong

Train stations 
 Davis station (California), Amtrak station in Davis, California
 Davis station (CTA), elevated public transit station in Evanston, Illinois
 Evanston Davis Street station, commuter railroad station in Evanston, Illinois
 Davis (MBTA station), subway station in Somerville, Massachusetts

People 
 Davis (surname)
 List of people with surname Davis
 Davis (given name)
 Dāvis

Other uses
 Davis Cup, premier international team event in men's tennis
 University of California, Davis, also known as "UC Davis"
 Davis Entertainment, an American independent film production company
 Davis Motorcar Company, manufacturer of three-wheeled automobiles from 1947 to 1948
 "Davis", a song by Chaz Jankel from the album Chazablanca

See also 
 Davis County (disambiguation)
 Davis Township (disambiguation)
 Fort Davis (disambiguation)
 Davis's law, in anatomy and physiology
 Davis gun, the first true recoilless gun
 Davis wing, an aircraft wing design
 Justice Davis (disambiguation)